Maria Creek is a national park in Far North Queensland, Australia, 1292 km northwest of Brisbane.  It is part of the Coastal Wet Tropics Important Bird Area, identified as such by BirdLife International because of its importance for the conservation of lowland tropical rainforest birds.

See also

 Protected areas of Queensland

References

National parks of Far North Queensland
Protected areas established in 1972
1972 establishments in Australia
Important Bird Areas of Queensland